Nicholas Lloyd (born 29 September 1963) is a New Zealand cricketer. He played in one List A and four first-class matches for Northern Districts in 1990/91.

See also
 List of Northern Districts representative cricketers

References

External links
 

1963 births
Living people
New Zealand cricketers
Northern Districts cricketers
Sportspeople from Maidstone